Shanklin railway station is a Grade II listed railway station serving Shanklin on the Isle of Wight. It is the present terminus of the Island Line from Ryde, although the line used to continue to Wroxall and Ventnor. The station now has one platform with a ticket office and a small shop, the second platform is now in use as a flower bed. The former subway has been filled in.

Passengers can change onto Southern Vectis buses to Ventnor and St Lawrence.

History
The station opened on 23 August 1864. The station buildings were extended in 1881.

Stationmasters

Robert Edward Wright 1864 - 1865 (afterwards station master at Ryde)
James Voy Sulley 1865 - 1871
Charles Panty 1871 (formerly station master at Wroxall, afterwards station master at Ryde St John's Road)
George Humby 1871 - 1913 (formerly station master at Brading)
Charles Herbert Colenutt 1913 - 1937 (formerly station master at Ryde St John's Road)
W. Lown from 1937  (formerly station master at Woldington)

Rail services
All rail services are operated by South Western Railway (Island Line). 

As of May 2022, there are two trains per hour north in the peak and one during the off-peak. Services call at all stations except Smallbrook Junction, which operates only during steam operating dates and times, and only one service an hour calls at Ryde Pier Head, which connect with Wightlink Ferries which take passengers to Portsmouth Harbour station.

Bus routes

The following buses run from Shanklin Station or nearby.  All services, unless noted, are run exclusively by Southern Vectis.

Gallery

References

External links 

Railway stations on the Isle of Wight
DfT Category E stations
Former Isle of Wight Railway stations
Railway stations in Great Britain opened in 1864
Island Line railway stations (Isle of Wight)
Railway station
Grade II listed buildings on the Isle of Wight